Séamus Ó Néill, (died 1981), was an Irish writer from Clarkhill, Castlewellan, County Down, Ireland.  Following a primary degree from Queen's University, Belfast, he did historical research under Eoin MacNeill at University College, Dublin.  He spent periods as editor of the journals An Iris and Comhar.

The endpiece from Dánta do pháistí (Poems for Children), entitled "Subh Milis" ("Sweet Jam"), a poem dedicated to his mother (subtitle: "Ceann do Mhama"), is his best-known work, and one of the Irish language texts most frequently referenced in English language media 

:

Two of his novels, Tonn Tuile and Máire Nic Artáin, dealt with marital breakdown - the first set during The Emergency and the latter in the religiously divided communities of Belfast during the First World War.

Works
An Sean-Saighdiúir agus scéalta eile (The veteran and other stories), 1945.
An iris/eagarth (An Iris edited), 1945–1946.
Colm Cille : drama i gceithre radharcanna (Columcill: a drama in four scenes), 1946.
Tonn tuile (Tidal Wave), Novel, Sáirséal agus Dill, 1947.
Dánta Poems, pre-1949;
Iomramh an Ousel (The Voyage of the Ousel), Poems, pre-1949;
Buaidh an Ultaigh (The Ulsterman will Win), Drama, pre-1949;
Díolta Faoina Luach (Below-cost Sales), Drama, pre-1949;
Ní Chuireann siad Síol (They Sow no Seed), Drama, pre-1949;
Dánta do pháistí (Poems for Children), 1949.
Súil timpeall (Eye Around), Essay, 1951.
Up the Rebels, Oifig an tSoláthair, 1954. Trans. Doiminic Ó Ceallaigh.
Ag baint fraochán : agus scéalta eile (Picking Blaeberries and other stories), 1955.
Máire Nic Artáin (Maire McCartan), Novel, Cló Morainn, 1959.
Iníon Rí Dhún Sobhairce : tragóid trí ghníomh (The King of Dunseverick's Daughter: a tragedy in three acts), 1967.
Faill ar an bhFeart : dráma trí ghníomh (Opportunity of a Miracle: a drama in three acts), 1967.
An tSiúr Pól : dráma trí ghníomh (Sister Paul: a drama in three acts), c.1973.
Rún an Oileáin (The Secret of the Island), pub. c.1975. Staged in the Damer Theatre, Dublin 5–10 June 1961.
Iníon rí na Spáinne (The King of Spain's Daughter), 1978.

Critical and bibliographic material
The Oxford Companion to Irish Literature, Welch, R. (ed.), The Clarendon Press, Oxford University, 1996.
A Biographical Dictionary of Irish Writers, Anne Brady & Brian Cleeve (eds.), The Lilliput Press, 1985.
Dictionary of Ulster Biography, in Newmann, K. (comp.), The Queen's University of Belfast, 1993.
Séamus Ó Néill bibliography from James Hardiman Library, UCG

See also
 List of Irish writers

1981 deaths
20th-century writers from Northern Ireland
Male poets from Northern Ireland
Male dramatists and playwrights from Northern Ireland
Irish-language poets
People from County Down
20th-century poets from Northern Ireland
20th-century Irish dramatists and playwrights
20th-century British male writers
Male novelists from Northern Ireland
20th-century novelists from Northern Ireland
20th-century British dramatists and playwrights